Following is a list of senators of Var, people who have represented the department of Var in the Senate of France.

Third Republic

Senators for Var under the French Third Republic were:

 Charles Brun (1876–1889)
 Jean-Baptiste Ferrouillat (1876–1891)
 Augustin Daumas (1889–1891)
 Edmond Magnier (1891–1895)
 Eugène Angles (1891–1897)
 Étienne Bayol (1896–1900)
 Victor Méric (1898–1909)
 Louis Sigallas (1900–1909)
 Georges Clemenceau (1902–1920)
 Victor Reymonenq (1909–1919)
 Louis Martin, (1909–1936)
 Gustave Fourment (1920–1940)
 René Renoult (1920–1940)
 Henry Senes (1936–1940)

Fourth Republic

Senators for Var under the French Fourth Republic were:

 Édouard Soldani (1946–1959)
 Toussaint Merle, (1946–1948)
 Albert Lamarque (1948–1958)
 Gabriel Escudier, (1958)

Fifth Republic 
Senators for Var under the French Fifth Republic:

Sénateurs actuels

References

Sources

 
Lists of members of the Senate (France) by department